Transjoik, originally named Frode Fjellheim Jazzjoik Ensemble (founded 1992 in Trondheim, Norway by Frode Fjellheim), is a Norwegian band that plays Sámi music, often characterised as an ambient electronic, techno and trance band, but with a dose of yoiking, so it is often considered world music.

Discography
Saajve Dance (Iđut 1994)
Mahkalahke (Warner Bros. 1997)
Meavraa (Warner Bros. 2000)
Uja Nami (Vuelie 2004), nominated for a Spellemannsprisen
Bewafá with vocals by Sher Mianfad Khan from Pakistan (Vuelie 2005)

Members
Frode Fjellheim (synth, vocals)
Tor Haugerud (percussion, vocals)
Nils-Olav Johansen (bass guitar, vocals)
Snorre Bjerck (percussion, vocals)

Awards
Liet International in the Netherlands, for Mijjajaa (2003)

External links
Transjoik

Sámi musical groups
Norwegian musical groups
Musical groups established in 1992